Burnley Football Club is an English professional association football club based in Burnley, Lancashire. It was founded on 18 May 1882 by members of rugby club Burnley Rovers, who voted for a change from rugby to association football. The suffix "Rovers" was dropped in the following days. Burnley became professional in 1883—one of the first to do so—putting pressure on the Football Association (FA) to permit payments to players. In 1885, the FA legalised professionalism, so the team entered the FA Cup for the first time in 1885–86, and were one of the twelve founder members of the Football League in 1888–89.

The team struggled in the early years of the Football League and were relegated to the Second Division at the end of the 1896–97 season. The side won promotion the following season, but were again relegated in 1899–1900. Burnley achieved promotion back to the First Division in 1912–13 under manager John Haworth; the following year the side won the FA Cup for the first—and to date only—time, after they defeated Liverpool in the final. In the 1920–21 campaign, Burnley were crowned champions of England for the first time. During that season they embarked on a 30-match unbeaten run, setting an English record. Burnley remained in the top tier of English football until 1929–30, when they sank to the second tier. The side gained promotion back to the first tier in 1946–47 and stayed there for 24 consecutive seasons.

From the 1950s until the 1970s, under chairman Bob Lord, the club became renowned for its youth policy and scouting system, and was one of the first to set up a purpose-built training ground. Burnley won a second league championship in 1959–60 under the management of Harry Potts with a last-day victory over Manchester City; with 80,000 inhabitants, the town of Burnley became one of the smallest to have an English first tier champion. Between 1970 and 1983, Burnley yo-yoed between the first and third tiers, and in 1985, they were relegated to the Fourth Division. During that time, they endured several periods of financial hardship. In 1986–87, a last-day win against Orient prevented relegation to the Football Conference, the highest level of non-League football. The team won the fourth tier in 1991–92 to become the second team to win all four professional divisions of the English football league system. They were promoted to the second tier in 1999–2000 and to the Premier League in 2008–09, 2013–14 and 2015–16.

Early years (1882–1912) 
On 18 May 1882, members of Burnley Rovers gathered at the Bull Hotel in Burnley to vote for a change from rugby to association football, following other sports clubs in the area that had changed to football. A large majority voted in favour of the proposal. The club secretary George Waddington met with his committee a few days later and put forward a proposal to drop "Rovers" from the club's name. Waddington stated that the club should "adopt the psychological high ground over many other local clubs by carrying the name of the town", to which the committee members unanimously agreed. Burnley played several trial matches with local sides during the following weeks "to select the best possible elevens for the coming season"; the new team was a combination of the former rugby players and arrivals with association football experience.

On 10 August, Burnley won their first recorded game as an association football club, described by the local newspaper as "a trial match", against local side Burnley Wanderers by a scoreline of 4–0. Burnley played the game in a blue-white kit—the colours of the former rugby club—at their home ground Calder Vale, which was also inherited from their predecessor. The club's first competitive game was in October 1882 against Astley Bridge in the Lancashire Cup, which ended in an 8–0 defeat. In February 1883, Burnley Cricket Club invited Burnley to move to a pitch adjacent to the cricket field at Turf Moor; both clubs have remained there since and Lancashire rivals Preston North End are the only team worldwide to have continuously occupied the same ground for longer. Burnley made a donation of £65 (the equivalent of £ as of ) toward the setup costs, and played their first match at Turf Moor on 17 February, losing 6–3 against Rawtenstall. In January 1883, Dr Thomas Dean, Burnley's medical officer of health, launched a football tournament to raise funds for the town's proposed new Victoria Hospital; it was a knockout competition between amateur clubs in the Burnley area, the final of which was played at Turf Moor. In June, Burnley won the Dr Dean's Cup outright to claim their first trophy, defeating Burnley Ramblers in the final by a scoreline of 2–1. Burnley subsequently won the new Hospital Cup in 1884 and on multiple occasions in later years. The team played 34 matches during their first season, winning 19, drawing 1 and losing 14.

By the end of 1883, the club had turned professional and signed many Scottish players, who were regarded as the best footballers by the Burnley committee. As a result, Burnley refused to join the Football Association (FA) and its FA Cup because the association barred professional players. In 1884, Burnley led a group of 35 clubs in the formation of the breakaway British Football Association (BFA) to challenge the supremacy of the FA. The threat of secession led to the FA changing its rule in July 1885, allowing professionalism, and the BFA subsequently ceased to exist. The side made their first appearance in the FA Cup in 1885–86; however, most professionals were still prohibited entry due to FA rules that year, so Burnley fielded their reserve side and lost 11–0 to Darwen Old Wanderers, the club's record defeat. In October 1886, Turf Moor became the first ground to be visited by a member of the Royal Family when Queen Victoria's grandson Prince Albert Victor attended a match between Burnley and Bolton Wanderers after he opened the town's new Victoria Hospital. To commemorate the visit, Burnley received a set of white jerseys featured with a blue sash and embellished with the royal coat of arms. The crest was regularly worn on the shirts until 1895, when it disappeared. In the 1887–88 FA Cup, the side took revenge on Darwen Old Wanderers by defeating the visitors 4–0 to record their first victory in the competition; Burnley were eliminated in the following round by Accrington.

In 1888, Aston Villa director William McGregor founded the Football League, the world's first league football competition. Burnley were among the twelve founder members and one of the six Lancashire-based sides. In the second game, William Tait became the first player to score a league hat-trick when his three goals gave Burnley their inaugural win in the competition (4–3 against Bolton Wanderers). The club finished ninth in its first league season and was re-elected. In March 1889, Jack Yates became the first Burnley player to play in a full international match, when he took to the field for England against Ireland. He scored a hat-trick in a 6–1 win for England, but was never called up again. Burnley finished only one place from bottom in 1889–90, following a run of 17 winless games at the start of the season, although the side won their first Lancashire Cup after they beat local rivals Blackburn Rovers 2–0 in the final. Burnley's nicknames at this point were "Turfites", "Moorites" or "Royalites", as a result of their ground's name and the royal connection.

The side recorded the biggest league victory in their history when they defeated Darwen by a scoreline of 9–0 in 1891–92; Burnley finished the season in mid-table—7th out of 14 teams. In the summer of 1894, Burnley followed other clubs and appoint a team manager; before, the Burnley team was selected by the board of directors or a committee whose secretary had the same powers and role as a manager has today. Burnley-born Harry Bradshaw was appointed; he had been involved with the club since its foundation and he had been a committee member since 1887. Under his reign, Burnley were relegated to the Second Division for the first time in 1896–97; they recorded a third place finish in a four team play-off series—between the bottom two First Division and the top two Second Division sides—called test matches, and were unable to avoid relegation. Burnley won the Second Division the next season as the team lost only two of thirty matches before they gained promotion through the test matches. The last game against First Division club Stoke was controversial; it finished 0–0 because both clubs needed only a draw to secure a place in the first tier. The game was later named "the match without a shot at goal". The Football League immediately withdrew the test match system in favour of automatic promotion and relegation. The Football League decided to expand the First Division from 16 clubs to 18 after a motion by Burnley, which meant that the other two teams—Blackburn Rovers and Newcastle United—also went into the first tier. The side finished in third place in their first season back in the top flight, Burnley's then highest league finish. During the summer, Bradshaw resigned as Burnley manager and left for Second Division club Woolwich Arsenal; he was succeeded by Ernest Mangnall.

The team were relegated again in 1899–1900 and became the centre of a controversy when their goalkeeper Jack Hillman attempted to bribe opponents Nottingham Forest in the last match of the season, which resulted in his suspension for the whole of the following season. It is possibly the earliest-recorded case of match fixing in football. Burnley continued to play in the Second Division in the first decade of the 20th century; the side finished in last place in 1902–03 but were re-elected. The struggling performances combined with the club's considerable financial debt saw manager Mangnall leave Burnley for Manchester United in October 1903; his successor was Spen Whittaker. In 1907, Burnley supporter Harry Windle was invited onto the board to become a director and two years later, he was elected chairman. The club's finances improved under Windle's guidance. The team reached the quarter-finals of the 1908–09 FA Cup but were eliminated by Mangnall's Manchester United in a replay. In the original match on the snow-covered pitch at Turf Moor, Burnley led 1–0 when the match was abandoned after 72 minutes. In April 1910, Whittaker was on his way to London by overnight train to register the signing of Harry Swift from Accrington. During the journey, he fell from one of the carriages, and died from his injuries shortly afterwards. The directors appointed John Haworth as the new manager, who subsequently signed Burnley's first overseas player—German Max Seeburg—and changed the club's colours from green to the claret and blue of First Division champions Aston Villa; Haworth and the Burnley directors believed the change might improve the club's fortunes. The side's form did improve; only a loss in the last game of the 1911–12 season denied the club promotion.

First major honour and decline (1912–1946) 
In 1912–13, Burnley were promoted to the First Division—as the country's top scorers with 88 goals—and reached the FA Cup semi-finals for the first time but lost to Sunderland after a replay. The next season, the team consolidated their place in the top flight and won their first major honour, the FA Cup, after a 1–0 win against Liverpool in the final at Crystal Palace. Bert Freeman scored the only goal as Burnley became the first side to beat five First Division clubs in one cup season. Burnley's captain Tommy Boyle received the FA Cup trophy from King George V; it was the first time a reigning monarch attended an FA Cup final. During this period, Turf Moor's capacity was increased to 50,000, almost equal to the town's male population.

The team finished fourth in 1914–15 before English football was suspended during the First World War. First team players Jonathan Brown, William Pickering, reserve players William Johnson, Harry Langtree and Alfred Lorrimer were killed during the conflict, while Teddy Hodgson died after he contracted a kidney problem. Upon resumption of full-time football in 1919–20, Burnley finished second to West Bromwich Albion and for the first time won the First Division championship in 1920–21. Burnley lost the season's opening three matches before they went on a 30-match run without defeat, an English record for unbeaten league games in a single season that lasted until Arsenal went invincible during the 2003–04 FA Premier League season. Burnley could not retain the title and finished third the next season, followed by a 15th place finish in 1922–23.

In February 1924, Burnley beat Huddersfield Town 1–0 in the FA Cup third round in front of 54,775 supporters, still the record for Turf Moor. A few months later, Haworth died of pneumonia, and became the second Burnley manager to die while in the post; his successor was Burnley-born Albert Pickles. Burnley struggled under his tenure and lost key player Bob Kelly to Sunderland in 1925; his transfer fee of £6,500 (equivalent to £ in ) broke the world record. The team avoided relegation by one point in 1925–26; Burnley lost 10–0 in their opening match against Aston Villa but won three of the last five games, including a 7–1 away win against Birmingham in which Louis Page scored a club record six goals.

Burnley attained a fifth-place finish in 1926–27—having led the championship for a brief spell during mid-season—but finished only 19th the next season, one point above the relegation zone. George Beel and Page scored 57 league goals between them during the latter season; Beel netted a club record 35 goals in the league. In November 1927, Turf Moor hosted its only senior international fixture, between England and Wales for the British Home Championship. Burnley's Jack Hill captained England, while Page played as forward; Hill scored an own goal to give the visitors a 2–1 win. Jerry Dawson, who holds the record for the most first team appearances in all competitions for Burnley with 569, retired in 1929 after 22 years at the club. In 1929–30, the side were relegated to the Second Division on goal average. A drop in home attendances coupled with financial problems saw the mid-season departure of key players Jack Bruton to Blackburn Rovers and Joe Devine to Newcastle United. Burnley's form remained inconsistent, and several long-term injuries to first team players resulted in relegation.

Burnley struggled in the Second Division and narrowly avoided further relegation in 1931–32 by two points; Beel, Burnley's all-time top goal scorer with 188 goals, left the club during the season. Gates at Turf Moor dropped under 5,000 in 1932; to reattract the interest of the local community, a supporters' club was formed, after which the attendances started to slightly improve. The years before the outbreak of the Second World War were characterised by mid-table league finishes, which were broken only by an FA Cup semi-final appearance in 1935. During the same year, the club changed its kit to white shirts with black shorts. In March 1936, Tommy Lawton became the youngest player to appear for the club, aged 16 years and 174 days on his debut against Doncaster Rovers; this also made him the Football League's then youngest ever centre-forward. After he scored 16 goals in 25 appearances for the side, Lawton moved to Everton in December 1936 for a fee of £6,500 (equivalent to £ in ), a then record for a player under 21. The team participated in the Wartime League and the Football League War Cup which continued throughout the Second World War until English football was fully restored in 1946. The club re-registered its colours as claret and blue in the same year, partly due to readers' letters to the Burnley Express.

Progressive and golden era (1946–1976) 
In 1946–47, the first season of post-war League football, Burnley took second place in the Second Division and gained promotion under manager Cliff Britton. The team's defence was nicknamed the "Iron Curtain", conceding only 29 goals in 42 league matches. The season also saw a run to the 1947 FA Cup Final, but ended in a 1–0 defeat after extra time to Charlton Athletic at Wembley. Burnley finished third in 1947–48; during the season, Turf Moor recorded its highest seasonal average attendance with 33,621, and the largest attendance at a league match with 52,869 against Blackpool. Former Burnley player Alan Brown was appointed manager in 1954 and Bob Lord chairman a year later; Lord was later described by Arthur Hopcraft as "the Khrushchev of Burnley" as a result of his combative attitude. The club became one of the most progressive under their tenures. Burnley was one of the first football clubs to set up a purpose-built training ground, at Gawthorpe in July 1955, and included a medical room, a gymnasium, three full-size pitches and an all-weather surface. Brown helped to dig out the ground and "volunteered" several of his players to assist. During the following years, the club became renowned for its youth policy and scouting system, which yielded many young, talented footballers. Their scouts—including Jack Hixon—were particularly based in North East England, Scotland and Northern Ireland.

In the 1955–56 season, Burnley reached the fourth round of the FA Cup, where they were knocked out by Chelsea after four replays. On his senior debut in 1957, 17-year-old Ian Lawson scored a club record four goals against Chesterfield in the FA Cup third round. In the next round, Burnley tied their largest  victory when they beat New Brighton by a scoreline of 9–0. The side reached the sixth round but were eliminated by Aston Villa after a replay. In 1958, former Burnley player Harry Potts was appointed manager. His side mainly revolved around captain Jimmy Adamson and Jimmy McIlroy, the team's playmaker, while his squad consisted mostly of players who were recruited from the club's youth academy. Only two players, McIlroy and Alex Elder, cost a transfer fee, with both players bought from Northern Irish club Glentoran for £8,000 (the equivalent of £ as of ) in 1950 and £5,000 (the equivalent of £ as of ) in January 1959, respectively. Potts often employed the then unfashionable 4–4–2 formation and implemented a playing style which later became known as Total Football. Jimmy Greaves labelled Burnley's style of play as "smooth, skilled football that was a warming advertisement for all that was best about British football". The side endured a tense 1959–60 season, in which Tottenham Hotspur and Wolverhampton Wanderers were the other contenders for the league title. Burnley won their second First Division championship on the last day with a 2–1 victory at Manchester City with goals from Brian Pilkington and Trevor Meredith. Although Burnley had been in contention all season, they had not led the table until the last match was played. The Daily Mirror noted: "Burnley, the team of quiet men—five of them are part-timers and the whole outfit cost less than £15,000—snatched the First Division Championship from the teeth of the famous Wolves". With 80,000 inhabitants, the town of Burnley became one of the smallest to have an English first-tier champion. After the season ended, the squad travelled to the United States to represent England in the International Soccer League, the first modern international American soccer tournament. Burnley defeated Bayern Munich (West Germany), Glenavon (Northern Ireland) and Nice (France) but finished runners-up in the group stage behind Scottish side Kilmarnock.

As a result of their First Division title, Burnley played the following season in European competition for the first time in the 1960–61 European Cup. They defeated former finalists Stade de Reims in the first round but were eliminated by Hamburger SV in the quarter-finals. Burnley shared the FA Charity Shield with Wolverhampton Wanderers, finished fourth in the league, and reached the FA Cup semi-final but lost to Tottenham. The team finished the 1961–62 First Division as runners-up to newly promoted Ipswich Town after they won only one of the last ten matches, and had a run to the 1962 FA Cup Final but lost against Tottenham. Jimmy Robson scored the 100th FA Cup Final goal at Wembley but it was the only reply to Tottenham's three goals. Adamson was named FWA Footballer of the Year, however, with McIlroy as runner-up.

The maximum wage in the Football League was abolished in 1961, which meant that clubs from small towns like Burnley could no longer compete financially with sides from bigger towns and cities. The controversial departure of McIlroy to Stoke City in 1963 and Adamson's retirement in 1964 also damaged the club's fortunes. Burnley retained their place in the First Division throughout the decade, however, finishing third in 1962–63 and 1965–66, with the club's Willie Irvine ending as the league's top goal scorer in the latter season. As a result of the third place finish in the 1965–66 campaign, Burnley qualified for the 1966–67 Inter-Cities Fairs Cup. After defeating Stuttgart, Lausanne Sports and Napoli, Burnley reached the quarter-finals of the competition, in which they were knocked out by West German side Eintracht Frankfurt. The team had a run to the League Cup semi-final in 1968–69 but were eliminated by Swindon Town after a replay.

After 12 years in the post, Potts stepped aside as manager and was replaced by Adamson in February 1970, who hailed his young squad as the "Team of the Seventies". Adamson was unable to halt the decline and the club was relegated in 1970–71. It ended an unbroken top flight spell of 24 consecutive seasons during which Burnley had often finished in the top half of the league table. Burnley won the Second Division title in 1972–73, after they lost only four times in 42 matches. As a result, the team were invited to play in the 1973 FA Charity Shield, which they won against Manchester City, the reigning holders of the shield. In the 1973–74 season, the side finished sixth in the First Division and reached the FA Cup semi-finals but lost to Newcastle United. The following season, the team experienced a shock defeat in the FA Cup against Wimbledon, then in the Southern League, who defeated Burnley 1–0 at Turf Moor. Adamson left Burnley in January 1976 and the team were relegated from the First Division later that year. During this period, a drop in home attendances combined with an enlarged debt forced Burnley to sell star players such as Martin Dobson and Leighton James, which caused a rapid decline in the club's fortunes.

Decline and near oblivion (1976–1988) 

Three mid-table finishes in the Second Division followed—although Burnley won the Anglo-Scottish Cup in 1978–79—before they were relegated to the Third Division in 1979–80 for the first time. In 42 league games, Burnley were victorious only 6 times and won none of the first 16 or the last 16 matches. In September 1981, after the club was in the Third Division relegation zone and close to bankruptcy, Lord decided to retire. The team then had only three more defeats after October and were promoted as champions under the management of former Burnley player Brian Miller. They were relegated the following year, although the team reached the FA Cup quarter-finals and the League Cup semi-finals, defeating Tottenham and Liverpool in the latter. Burnley won 1–0 against Liverpool in the semi-final second leg but were eliminated after they lost the first leg 3–0.

The board made several managerial changes in a search for success; in early 1983, Miller was replaced with Frank Casper, who was succeeded by John Bond before the 1983–84 season. Bond was the first manager since Frank Hill (1948–1954) without a previous playing career at the club; fans criticised Bond for increasing Burnley's debt by signing expensive players, and for selling Lee Dixon, Brian Laws and Trevor Steven. In August 1984, Bond was replaced with John Benson, who was in charge when Burnley were relegated to the Fourth Division for the first time at the end of the 1984–85 season. Burnley were managed briefly by Martin Buchan and then Tommy Cavanagh during 1985–86 before Miller returned in July 1986. For the 1986–87 campaign, the Football League introduced automatic relegation and promotion between the Fourth Division and the Football Conference, the top tier of non-League football in England. During the 1986–87 season, Burnley won only 12 of 46 league games and suffered a 3–0 FA Cup first round defeat at non-League Telford United. Burnley went into the season's last league match in bottom place; they needed to win against Orient, for Lincoln City to lose their game, and Torquay United to not win theirs. A 2–1 win before a crowd of over 15,000—five times more than the club's seasonal average—with goals from Neil Grewcock and Ian Britton kept Burnley in the Fourth Division as Torquay drew and Lincoln lost.

During the mid and late 1980s, Burnley had a new local rival team in Colne Dynamoes, who were rapidly progressing through the English non-League system. Colne's chairman-manager Graham White made a proposal for a groundshare of Turf Moor and attempted to buy the club in early 1989; the Burnley board rejected these offers. In 1987, the Burnley board had reportedly attempted to purchase almost-bankrupt Welsh club Cardiff City and relocate it to Turf Moor if Burnley were relegated; this would have been the Football League's first franchise operation.

Recovery (1988–2009) 
In 1988, Burnley were back at Wembley to play Wolverhampton Wanderers in the Associate Members' Cup Final, which they lost 2–0. The match was attended by more than 80,000 people, a record for a game between two teams from the fourth tier. In 1990–91, Burnley qualified for the Fourth Division play-offs under manager Casper but were eliminated in the semi-final by Torquay United. Burnley won the league the following season under their new manager Jimmy Mullen in the last-ever season of the Fourth Division before the league reorganisation. Mullen had succeeded Casper in October 1991 and won his first nine league matches as manager. By winning the fourth tier, Burnley became only the second club to win all four professional divisions of English football, after Wolverhampton Wanderers. In 1993–94, the side won the Second Division play-offs and gained promotion to the second tier. They won 3–1 on aggregate against Plymouth Argyle in the semi-final and faced Stockport County in the final; Burnley won the game 2–1 as two Stockport players were sent off. Relegation followed after one season; as a result of Burnley's season at the second level, the club was granted £2.25 million (the equivalent of £ as of ) by the Football Trust. These funds had to be spent within 12 months and helped to convert Turf Moor into an all-seater stadium to fulfil the safety recommendations of the Taylor Report. The North and the Jimmy McIlroy Stands replaced the Longside and the Bee Hole End terraces in 1996 at a total cost of over £5 million to take Turf Moor's capacity to almost 23,000. In 1997–98, a last-day 2–1 victory over Plymouth prevented relegation back into the fourth tier. Chris Waddle was player-manager that season, but was replaced by Stan Ternent during the summer. Burnley finished second in 1999–2000 and gained promotion to the second tier; the team's striker and lifelong Burnley fan Andy Payton was the division's top goal scorer.

The side immediately became serious contenders for a promotion play-off place during the 2000–01 and 2001–02 seasons. In the latter campaign, Burnley finished level on points with sixth-placed Norwich City, but missed the last play-off place on goal difference by one goal. In early 2002, financial problems caused by the collapse of ITV Digital brought the club close to administration. In 2002–03, Burnley ranked 16th out of 24 teams and reached the FA Cup quarter-finals, but were eliminated by Watford. Ternent was sacked in June 2004, after the club narrowly avoided relegation with a squad composed of several loaned players and some players who were not entirely fit. Steve Cotterill was then appointed as manager. In 2006, Turf Moor and Gawthorpe were sold to Longside Properties for £3 million (equivalent to £ in ) to resolve the club's financial problems; chairman Barry Kilby owned 51 per cent of the company's shares, while Burnley director John Sullivan held the remaining 49 per cent. In the 2006–07 campaign, Burnley went 19 consecutive games without a win between December and March. The sequence of draws and losses ended in April, when Burnley beat Plymouth 4–0 at home, and a short run of good form saw them finish comfortably above the relegation zone, ensuring they remained in the Championship.

Another run of poor results the following season led to Cotterill's departure in November 2007; his replacement was Owen Coyle. The 2008–09 campaign, Coyle's first full season in charge, ended with Burnley's highest league finish since 1976: fifth in the Championship. Burnley qualified for the Championship play-offs and defeated Reading 3–0 on aggregate in the semi-final. They beat Sheffield United in the Championship play-off Final, which meant promotion to the top flight after 33 years; Wade Elliott scored the only goal. Burnley also reached the League Cup semi-final for the first time in over 25 years after they beat local clubs Bury and Oldham Athletic, and London-based clubs Fulham, Chelsea and Arsenal. In the semi-finals, Burnley played Tottenham Hotspur but lost the first leg 4–1. Burnley led 3–0 at home after 90 minutes in the second leg, but were eliminated after Tottenham scored two goals in the last two minutes of extra time.

Premier League football and back in Europe (2009–present) 

After the team's promotion, Burnley became the one of smallest towns to host a Premier League club. The side started the 2009–10 season well and became the first newly promoted team in the competition to win their first four home games, including a 1–0 victory against defending champions Manchester United. Coyle left the club in January 2010 to manage local rivals Bolton Wanderers, who he said were "5 or 10 years ahead" of Burnley. He was replaced with former player Brian Laws, under whom Burnley's form deteriorated, and the team were relegated after a single season in the Premier League. Laws was dismissed in December 2010 and replaced by Eddie Howe, who guided the team to an eighth-place finish in 2010–11, missing out on a play-off place. In October 2012, Howe left Burnley to rejoin Bournemouth "for personal reasons". He was replaced in the same month with former Watford manager Sean Dyche.

Before the start of the 2013–14 campaign, Turf Moor and Gawthorpe returned to club ownership after a seven-year period. Burnley were tipped as relegation candidates by the bookies; Dyche had to work with a tight budget and a small squad, and Burnley's top goal scorer from the previous season, Charlie Austin, had moved to Championship rivals Queens Park Rangers. In Dyche's first full season in charge, however, Burnley finished second and were promoted back to the Premier League. The new strike partnership of Danny Ings and Sam Vokes had 41 league goals between them. Dyche used only 23 players during the season, which was the joint-lowest in the division, and had paid only one transfer fee—£400,000 for striker Ashley Barnes. The club finished the following season 19th out of 20 clubs and were again relegated to the Championship. In 2015–16, Burnley won the Championship title when they equalled their 2013–14 club record of 93 points and ended the season with a run of 23 undefeated league games. Their new signing Andre Gray from Brentford scored 23 goals for Burnley and became the league's top goal scorer.

The side finished the 2016–17 season in 16th place, six points above the relegation zone, and were guaranteed to play consecutive seasons in the top flight for the first time in the Premier League era. In that season's FA Cup, Burnley were eliminated in the fifth round at home by National League club Lincoln City, who won the game 1–0; this was Burnley's second FA Cup home defeat against a non-League club while in the top flight since 1975. During the year, the club's new Barnfield Training Centre was completed and replaced the 60-year-old Gawthorpe. Dyche was involved in the design and had willingly tailored his transfer spending as he and the board focused on the club's infrastructure and future. Burnley finished the 2017–18 season in seventh place, winning more points in away matches than at Turf Moor; it was their highest league finish since 1973–74. Burnley qualified for the 2018–19 UEFA Europa League, their first competitive European campaign in 51 years, but were eliminated in the play-off round by Greek side Olympiacos after the side had defeated Scottish club Aberdeen and Turkish team İstanbul Başakşehir in the previous qualifying rounds.

The 2019–20 season was interrupted for three months because of the COVID-19 pandemic before being completed behind closed doors; Burnley concluded the campaign in 10th place, five points below the European qualification places. In December 2020, American investment company ALK Capital acquired an 84% stake in Burnley for £170 million. It was the first time the club was run by anyone other than local businessmen and Burnley supporters. ALK borrowed much of the takeover money, and the loan debts were transferred to the club. As a result of this leveraged takeover, Burnley went from being debt-free to being saddled with debts of around £100 million, at interest rates of about 8 per cent. In April 2022, Dyche was sacked after a run of poor results; Burnley won eleven points from eight matches under caretaker manager Mike Jackson, but were relegated back to the Championship after they lost on the final matchday against Newcastle United, finishing in 18th place.

In June 2022, the Belgian Vincent Kompany was appointed Burnley's manager, becoming the first person from outside the British Isles to manage the club. During his first months in charge, he signed 16 players—mostly young and foreign—as he rebuilt the squad on a budget. Kompany also implemented a possession-based, attacking style of play.

Notes

References 
Specific

General

External links 
 Club history at the Burnley F.C. website
 The Longside – Your Online Clarets Encyclopedia (archived)

Burnley F.C.
Burnley